WYAT-LD, UHF digital channel 25 and UHF virtual channel 40, is a low-powered This TV-affiliated television station. The station is licensed to Martinsville, Virginia and serves Martinsville and Henry County in Virginia. WYAT-LD is owned by Martinsville Media, LLC. and operated under their Martinsville Media, Inc. licensee.

References

External links
 WYAT-LD Online
 

1999 establishments in Virginia
Television channels and stations established in 1999
YAT-LD
This TV affiliates
Low-power television stations in the United States